{{Speciesbox
| image = Euxoa_panoplias.JPG
| status = PE
| status_system = IUCN3.1
| status_ref = <ref name="iucn status 24 May 2022">{{cite iucn |author=Walker, A. |author2=Medeiros, M.J. |date=2021 |title=Agrotis panoplias. The IUCN Red List of Threatened Species 2021: e.T188988592A189703162 |volume=2021 |doi=10.2305/IUCN.UK.2021-3.RLTS.T188988592A189703162.en |access-date=24 May 2022}}</ref>
| taxon = Agrotis panoplias
| authority = Meyrick, 1899
| synonyms = 
}}Agrotis panoplias'', the Kona agrotis noctuid moth, is a species of moth in the family Noctuidae. It is now considered as possibly extinct.

Formerly, it was endemic to Kona District, Hawaii, United States.

Sources

 2006 IUCN Red List of Threatened Species.   
Hawaii's Extinct Species - Insects

Agrotis
Endemic moths of Hawaii
Moths described in 1899